Vakhsh District ( Nohiya-i Vakhsh) is a district in Khatlon Region, Tajikistan. Its capital is Vakhsh. It is located in the southern part of Khatlon and of the country. The population of the district is 199,300 (January 2020 estimate).

Administrative divisions
They are as follows:

References

Districts of Khatlon Region
Districts of Tajikistan